Fort Hill Cemetery is a cemetery located in Auburn, New York, United States. It was incorporated on May 15, 1851 under its official name: "Trustees of the Fort Hill Cemetery Association of Auburn". It is known for its headstones of notable people such as former Secretary of State William H. Seward, his son, William H. Seward Jr. and abolitionist and freedom fighter Harriet Tubman. It is built on what was once a fortified village of the Cayuga Nation.

Notable burials
The cemetery features headstones of such notable people as:
 Elizabeth Hazelton Haight, a pioneering early female classicist, who worked at Vassar College.
 Myles Walter Keogh, civil war Brevet Lt. Colonel; fell at the Battle of the Little Bighorn with Custer.
 Fannie E. McKinney-Hughey, music teacher who developed the Color-Music method to teach music to children.
 Benjamin C. Mead, United States Attorney for the Northern District of New York.
 Thomas Mott Osborne, Warden of Sing Sing
 Frances Adeline Seward, wife of William H. Seward and abolitionist
 William H. Seward, New York Governor, Senator and U.S. Secretary of State
 William H. Seward Jr., banker and brigadier general in the Union Army during the American Civil War
 Harriet Tubman, who is resting on Fort Hill Cemetery's "West Lawn C", beneath a large tree with two small bushes on each side of her headstone
 Martha Coffin Wright, feminist, abolitionist, and signatory of the Declaration of Sentiments.

Other
The Bradley Mortuary Chapel (which also serves as the cemetery office and gatehouse) was designed by the architect Julius A. Schweinfurth in a Gothic Revival style and completed in 1893. Julius A. Schweinfurth was a brother and partner to Charles F. Schweinfurth.

Gallery

References

External links
 

Buildings and structures in Auburn, New York
1851 establishments in New York (state)
Cemeteries in Cayuga County, New York